A smart home hub, sometimes also referred to as a "smart hub", "gateway'", "bridge", "controller" or "coordinator", is a control center/centre for a smart home, and enables the components of a smart home to communicate and respond to each other via communication through a central point. The smart home hub can consist of dedicated computer appliance, software appliance, or software running on computer hardware, and makes it possible to gather configuration, automation and monitoring of a smart house by communicating and controlling different smart devices that consist of for example home appliances, sensors and relays or robots, many of which are commonly categorized under Internet of things.

A smart home can contain one, several, or even no smart home hubs. When using several smart home hubs it is sometimes possible to connect them to each other. Some smart home hubs support a wider selection of components, while others are more specialized for controlling products within certain product groups or using certain wireless technologies (e.g. Wi-Fi, Bluetooth, Z-Wave, and/or Zigbee).

A smart speaker with a virtual assistant can often be used for speech input to a smart home hub.

Open or closed source code 
Smart home hubs can have software with open source code or use proprietary software with closed source code, and independently of this the application programming interface can be public or closed. Some smart home hubs must run on proprietary hardware, while others (like for example Home Assistant) can be installed on generic hardware (like for example a laptop or single-board computer with Linux).

Examples of commercial smart home hubs 
Some examples of smart home hubs with closed source code are:
 Logitech Harmony Hub
 SmartThings Hub
 Google Nest Hub
 Amazon Echo Show and Amazon Echo Plus which both integrates a Zigbee hub.
 Apple HomePod

Some examples of smart home hubs based on free and open-source software are:
 Home Assistant
 OpenHAB

Some examples of smart home hubs with closed source code, but an open application programming interface are:
 Homey

Communication protocols 
Various communication protocols can be used between smart home hubs and smart house components. The protocols can be grouped into wired and wireless technologies.

Wireless protocols 
Some examples of wireless protocols commonly used in smart home hubs are:

 2,45 Ghz (WiFi, Bluetooth, Zigbee, Thread, Matter)
 Z-Wave (868 Mhz)
 RF 868 (868 Mhz, various protocols)
 RF 433 (433 Mhz, various protocols)
 Infrared light (430 THz; 697 nm)

Wired protocols 
There are several cabled bus systems, some of which are built directly into electric panels. Some examples of wired protocols commonly used in smart home hubs are:

 DALI, open standard for network-based lighting control in buildings, well suited for dimming.
 KNX, older and well-established open standard for network-based control of lighting, sensors, HVAC, etc. in buildings. There is also a wireless extension of KNX called KNX-RF.
 DMX, a standard for control of stage lighting, smoke machines and more, but also used to a certain extent for home automation due to the widespread use in professional stage equipment and good availability on the market
 X10, widespread in older home automation equipment in the USA, but only used to a small extent in new installations.
 LonWorks, an open standard for networking platforms used for control applications of lighting and HVAC.
 MQTT, an open network protocol for machine to machine communication, particularly used for transmission of telemetry data in Internet of things components.
 BACnet, an open protocol (ISO 16484-5) for information exchange between building automation systems, regardless of the particular building service they perform. Designed for applications such as automation and control of heating, ventilating, and air-conditioning control (HVAC), lighting control, access control, fire detection systems, and associated equipment.
 Modbus, an openly published and royalty free data communications protocol, especially popular in industrial environments.
 Meter-Bus (M-Bus), an open standard for remote reading of consumption meters, e.g.  water, gas or electricity meters.

See also 
 List of home automation software
 Smart speaker

References 

Home automation